Adaś Miauczyński is a fictional character created by Marek Koterski. He has featured in a series of films and stage works as well as a musical. Adaś (in two films, he is presented as Michał Miauczyński) is a Polish man whose first name, Adaś, is a diminutive form of Adam, while Miauczyński is a wordplay derived from "meow", a sound produced by cats. He is a vulgar, neurotic, and frustrated intellectual who either lives alone or with his ex-wife, and sometimes with his children.

The character has appeared in nine feature films: Dom wariatów (1984), Życie wewnętrzne (1987), Porno (1989), Nothing Funny (1995), Ajlawju (1999), Day of the Wacko (2002), We're All Christs (2006), Baby są jakieś inne (2011), and 7 uczuć (2018). Each story showcases a different aspect or era of his life, often with little continuity between them. He has been portrayed by different actors, both on stage and onscreen.

In 2017, a musical about Miauczyński, based on Day of the Wacko, was released.

Film series
 Dom wariatów – portrayed by Marek Kondrat (1984)
 Życie wewnętrzne – portrayed by Wojciech Wysocki (1987)
 Porno – portrayed by Zbigniew Rola (1989)
 Nothing Funny – portrayed by Cezary Pazura/Franciszek Barciś (1995)
 Ajlawju – portrayed by Cezary Pazura (1999)
 Day of the Wacko – portrayed by Marek Kondrat (2002)
 We're All Christs – portrayed by Andrzej Chyra / Marek Kondrat (2006)
 Baby są jakieś inne – portrayed by Adam Woronowicz (2011)
 7 uczuć – portrayed by Michał Koterski (2018)

Gallery

References

Fictional alcohol abusers
Fictional characters with obsessive–compulsive disorder
Fictional directors
Fictional linguists
Fictional poets
Fictional Polish people
Fictional schoolteachers
Male characters in film
Male characters in literature
Film characters